Mendeleyevskaya is a Moscow Metro station on the Serpukhovsko-Timiryazevskaya Line. It is located in the Tverskoy District of central Moscow.

It was opened on 31 December 1988. The station was designed by Nina Aleshina and Natalya Samoilova on the theme of Dmitri Mendeleev and his works.

The transfer to the Novoslobodskaya station of the Koltsevaya Line is available.

A stray dog named Malchik lived at the station, and after he was killed a monument Compassion was erected in the station.

See also
 Malchik

References

External links
Mendeleyevskaya on metro.ru

Moscow Metro stations
Serpukhovsko-Timiryazevskaya Line
Tverskoy District
Railway stations in Russia opened in 1988
Railway stations located underground in Russia